The Ting River flows  from Ninghua County in western Fujian south to the port and Special Economic Zone of Shantou, Guangdong. It is a main tributary of the Han River and is also referred to Hakka Mother River. 

The former prefecture of Tingzhou fu or T'ingchow-fu (汀州府) was administered from a centre on the upper river, now the town of Tingzhou in Changting County; all these places are named for the river. As most inhabitants of Tingzhou-fu/Changting are Hakka, and as (Hakka-speaking) Meizhou (梅州) is next downstream, the Tingjiang is considered by some to be the mother river of all the Hakkas. 

The Tingjiang is unique among Fujianese rivers in that its lower watershed and debouchment are outside the province. The traffic in Tingzhou-fu/Changting then (before road and rail came very recently) was always primarily with eastern areas of Guangdong, namely Meizhou and, further down, the Min-Nan-speaking Chao-Shan area -- Chaozhou (潮州) and Shantou (汕头).

Tributaries
 Yongding River (Fujian) - left tributary; much of Yongding County is within its drainage area. (Not to be confused with the Yongding River in Beijing).

See also
 Zijin_Mining#July_2010_acid_incident

Rivers of Fujian
Rivers of Guangdong
Tributaries of the Pearl River (China)